The SBB RABDe 500, also known as the ICN, is a Swiss high speed passenger train which was introduced in 2000, in time for Expo.02 held in western Switzerland in 2002. The train sets were a joint development by Bombardier, Swiss Federal Railways and Alstom, with an aerodynamic body designed by Pininfarina, bogies and tilting mechanism designed by the then SIG, Schweizerische Industrie Gesellschaft.

Forty-four RABDe 500 trains with a total of 308 coaches were delivered to SBB-CFF-FFS between 1999 and 2005. The RABDe 500 often run with two complete compositions, each with seven carriages, both including a dining car. The outer four of the seven carriages are second class.

History
Swiss Federal Railways ordered an initial 24 7-car trainsets in 1996 at a cost of  The contract went to a consortium including Adtranz, and Fiat-SIG. Pininfarina designed the vehicle body. The trains were intended for use on the Jura Foot Line; adopting tilting technology allowed SBB to defer track upgrades over the route.

The first trainsets entered service on the 28 May 2000 timetable change, running from St. Gallen via Winterthur, Zürich and Biel/Bienne to Lausanne. All 24 trainsets were in service by the opening of the Expo.02 national exposition in May 2002. The trains all carried the slogan "enable the future".

SBB ordered another 10 trainsets, with an option for 10 more, in June 2001. Delivery was complete by 2005.

Formerly, SBB designated intercity services operated by the SBB RABDe 500 as "ICN", differentiating them from other InterCity (IC) and InterRegio (IR) services. This practice ceased with the December 2017 timetable changes, in which all IC and IR services gained numbers and the ICN category was eliminated. RABDe 500-operated services are indicated on timetables and mobile applications by the "" label.

All 44 trainsets were refurbished between 2012 and 2019, an overhaul taking 25 days per train. Another overhaul, taking place between 2021 and 2029, will replace the interiors and improve mobile phone reception.

Design
Each formation is composed of seven cars. The first two and last two cars in the trainset are the second class cars, and have the traction motors and powered axles. The three middle cars carry first class seating; the third car is split between first class and the restaurant car. The car body is a monocoque design built out of aluminium.

The RABDe 500 can tilt at a maximum of 8 degrees. On routes with a significant number of curves, the tilting technology could reduce travel times by 10-20%. For example, on the Lausanne–St. Gallen route, the introduction of the trains shortened travel times by 15 minutes.

In 2015–2016, eighteen trainsets were adapted for operation in the Gotthard Base Tunnel. Changes included improved fire detection equipment, cab signaling upgrades, and improvements to heating and cooling. This was a temporary measure until newer non-tilting trains SBB RABe 501 Giruno trains became available.

Naming
All forty-four RABDe 500 trains are named after famous Swiss scholars, artists, writers, politicians, engineers, and architects. Each train bears the portrait of its namesake, painted by Bernese painter Martin Fivian, in the third car (first class and restaurant).

List of names:

 500 000	Le Corbusier
 500 001	Jean Piaget
 500 002	Annemarie Schwarzenbach
 500 003	Madame de Staël
 500 004	Mani Matter
 500 005	Johann Heinrich Pestalozzi
 500 006	Johanna Spyri
 500 007	Albert Einstein
 500 008	Vincenzo Vela
 500 009	Friedrich Dürrenmatt
 500 010	Robert Walser
 500 011	Blaise Cendrars
 500 012	Jean Rudolf von Salis
 500 013	Denis de Rougemont
 500 014	Max Frisch
 500 015	Jean-Jacques Rousseau
 500 016	Alice Rivaz
 500 017	Willi Ritschard
 500 018	Adolf Wölfli
 500 019	Friedrich Glauser
 500 020	Jeanne Hersch
 500 021	Jeremias Gotthelf

 500 022	Expo.02
 500 023	Charles Ferdinand Ramuz
 500 024	
 500 025	
 500 026	Alfred Escher
 500 027	Henry Dunant
 500 028	Francesco Borromini
 500 029	Eduard Spelterini
 500 030	Louis Chevrolet
 500 031	Louis Favre
 500 032	Henry Dufaux
 500 033	Gallus Jacob Baumgartner
 500 034	
 500 035	Niklaus Riggenbach
 500 036	Minister Kern
 500 037	Grock
 500 038	Arthur Honegger
 500 039	Auguste Piccard
 500 040	Graf Zeppelin
 500 041	William Barbey
 500 042	
 500 043	Harald Szeemann

See also

 Train categories in Europe
 List of high-speed trains

Notes

References

Further reading

External links

 ICN on SBB

Tilting trains
Multiple units of Switzerland
Train-related introductions in 2000
Articles containing video clips
High-speed trains